Department of the Prime Minister and Cabinet is a government office in Australia and New Zealand:
Department of the Prime Minister and Cabinet (Australia)
Department of the Prime Minister and Cabinet (New Zealand)

See also
Cabinet department
Prime Minister's Department, in Malaysia
Prime Minister's Office (disambiguation)
Cabinet Office (disambiguation)